The Second Church (1649–1970) in Boston, Massachusetts, was first a Congregational church, and then beginning in 1802, a Unitarian church. The congregation occupied a number of successive locations around town, including North Square, Hanover Street, Copley Square, and the Fenway. Ministers included Michael Powell, Increase Mather, Cotton Mather, and Ralph Waldo Emerson.  In 1970 it merged with Boston's First Church.

History

Buildings
Through its long history, the Second Church had some eight church buildings successively, located in various parts of Boston:
 North Square (1649–1776). In 1677 a new building replaced the old.
 Hanover Street (1779–1849). In 1779 the Second Church merged with the New Brick Church, and moved into the New Brick's building on Hanover St. In 1845 a new building replaced the old.
 Bedford Street (1854–1872)
 Copley Square (1874–1914), on Boylston Street, between Dartmouth and Clarendon. Building designed by N.J. Bradlee, in the gothic revival style.
 874 Beacon Street, at Park Drive (1914–1970). Building designed by Ralph Adams Cram, now home to Ruggles Baptist Church.

Ministers
17th–18th centuries
 John Mayo (minister 1655–1673)
 Increase Mather (minister 1664–1723)
 Cotton Mather (minister 1685–1728)
 Joshua Gee (minister 1723–1748)
 Samuel Mather (minister 1732–1741)
 Samuel Checkley Jr. (minister 1747–1768)
 John Lathrop (minister 1768–1816)
19th century
 Henry Ware Jr. (minister 1817–1830)

 Ralph Waldo Emerson (junior minister 1829–1832)
 Chandler Robbins (1810–1882; minister 1833–1874)
 Robert Laird Collier (minister 1876–1878)
 Edward Augustus Horton (minister 1880–1892)
 Thomas Van Ness (minister 1893–1913)
20th century
 Samuel Raymond Maxwell (minister 1914–1919)
 Eugene Rodman Shippen (minister 1920–1929)
 Dudley Hays Ferrell (minister 1931–1932)
 DuBois LeFevre (minister 1933–1940)
 Walton E. Cole (minister 1941–1945)
 G. Ernest Lynch Jr. (minister 1947–1949)
 Clayton Brooks Hale (minister 1950–1957)
 John Nicholls Booth (minister 1958–1964)
 John K. Hammon (minister 1964–1970)

Image gallery

References

Further reading

 [https://books.google.com/books?id=RA8aAAAAYAAJ The Second Church in Boston]: commemorative services held on the completion of two hundred and fifty years since its foundation, 1649–1899. Boston: The Society, 1900.

External links
  Photograph taken between 1874 and 1914.

Former buildings and structures in Boston
1649 establishments in Massachusetts
1970 disestablishments in Massachusetts
History of Boston
Churches in Boston
North End, Boston
Copley Square